Selivanovo is a rural locality (a village) in Gorodetskoye Rural Settlement, Kichmengsko-Gorodetsky District, Vologda Oblast, Russia. The population was 27 as of 2002.

Geography 
Selivanovo is located 58 km northwest of Kichmengsky Gorodok (the district's administrative centre) by road. Kryazh is the nearest rural locality.

References 

Rural localities in Kichmengsko-Gorodetsky District